Dara Taylor is an American composer for film and television scores. An HMMA-nominated composer, she has composed music for a number of Independent films including thrillers, dramas, and comedies. She has contributed additional music to ABC's Agent Carter,  Galavant and Lifetime’s Child Genius as well as arrangements and score production for studio productions like Bad Moms, Baywatch, Smurfs The Lost Village, Sausage Party, and more. In 2015, she was nominated for a Hollywood Music in Media Award for her score for the Together Magic film Undetectable. In 2016, she was one of the composers asked to take part in Women in Film’s Women Composers in Media concert.

Taylor was born in Poughkeepsie, New York but spent most of her childhood in Lockport, New York. She studied as a mezzo-soprano under Judith Kellock at Cornell University and sang in the Cornell University Chorus. Also at Cornell, she studied composition independently with Zachary Wadsworth and Steven Stucky. In 2009, she graduated cum laude with a Bachelor's in Music and Psychology. Taylor then received a Masters of Music from New York University in 2011 where she studied Film Music Composition with Mark Suozzo.

Taylor is currently based in Los Angeles, CA.

Filmography

Short films
For Gunther's Eyes Only

Film
Strays

References

Year of birth missing (living people)
Living people
American women composers
American television composers
American film score composers
Cornell University alumni
People from Lockport, New York
New York University alumni
21st-century American women